The London Triathlon (currently known as the "AJ Bell London Triathlon", and previously the Virgin Active London Triathlon, Mazda London Triathlon and the Michelob ULTRA London Triathlon, for sponsorship reasons) is an annual triathlon event in London, England. Until 2015 it was the largest triathlon in the world. It is the only triathlon to take place in central London following the relocation of the International Triathlon Union London event to Leeds.

Participants can choose between four individual distances or two team relay distances:

Super Sprint: 400m swim, 10 km bike, 2.5 km run
Sprint: 750m swim, 20 km bike, 5 km run
Olympic: 1500m swim, 40 km bike, 10 km run
Olympic Plus: 1500m swim, 80 km bike, 10 km run

The course passes some of the city's landmarks such as the London Eye, Westminster, London Bridge and the O2.

Participants can fundraise for one of the events official charity partners, with Bloodwise and Macmillan being the two gold charities for 2016.

Held annually in London, England, the race attracts a field of elite athletes and in excess of 13,000 competitors and 30,000 spectators to the ExCeL Exhibition Centre, in the London Docklands. Previous winners include Tim Don, Stuart Hayes, Vicky Holland, Helen Jenkins, Jodie Swallow and Emma Snowsill. The 2015 elite male and female races were won by Peter Kerr and Helen Jenkins, respectively. The event is owned by IMG.

Thousands of pounds is raised every year and the 2015 Gold Charity was Macmillan Cancer Support. A large number of companies taking part in the corporate waves.

An hour highlights show of the event is broadcast on Channel 4, Sky Sports and British Eurosport in the weeks following the event.

See also
Sport in London
London Marathon

References

External links
Official Website

Triathlon competitions
Triathlon
Athletics in London
Triathlon